"Fatty Girl" is a collaborative single by rappers Ludacris, LL Cool J and Keith Murray. The song was produced by the Trackmasters and was released as the lead single from the FUBU compilation The Good Life. The music video was directed by Hype Williams.

The song became a minor hit on the Billboard Hot 100, peaking at number 87. It found more success on the Hot Rap Singles, reaching number six.

The album was mentioned by FUBU CEO Daymond John on an episode of ABC's Shark Tank. John said he was in the hole for $6 million on the album but the hit single "Fatty Girl" ended up earning $100 million through clothing.

The song is also notable for being the first recorded use of the word "badonkadonk", coined by Keith Murray.

Single track listing
"Fatty Girl" (Squeaky Clean Edit) – 3:55
"Fatty Girl" (Radio version) – 3:54
"Fatty Girl" (Album version) – 3:52
"Fatty Girl" (Instrumental) – 3:54

Chart history

References

2001 singles
2001 songs
Ludacris songs
LL Cool J songs
Keith Murray (rapper) songs
Music videos directed by Hype Williams
Song recordings produced by Trackmasters
Songs written by Ludacris
Songs written by LL Cool J
Dirty rap songs